National Highway 161E, commonly referred to as NH 161E, is a national highway in  India. It is a spur road of National Highway 61. NH-161E traverses the state of Maharashtra in India.

Route 

Washim, Bhoyar, Shelgaon, Mangrulpir, Poghat, Karanja, Kamargaon, Hivra Bk.

Junctions  

  Terminal near Washim.
  Terminal near Hivra Bk.

See also 

 List of National Highways in India
 List of National Highways in India by state

References

External links 

 NH 161E on OpenStreetMap

National highways in India
National Highways in Maharashtra